Manuel Suárez (19 November 1920 – 31 January 2001) was a Spanish hurdler. He competed in the men's 110 metres hurdles at the 1948 Summer Olympics.

References

1920 births
2001 deaths
Athletes (track and field) at the 1948 Summer Olympics
Spanish male hurdlers
Olympic athletes of Spain
Place of birth missing